The National Commission on Libraries and Information Science (NCLIS) was an agency in the United States government between 1970 and 2008.  The activities of the Commission were consolidated into the Institute of Museum and Library Services. Records of NCLIS are held at the University of Michigan Library, Special Collections as part of the Power Collection for the Study of Scholarly Communication and Information Transfer.

Origins

President Lyndon B. Johnson appointed a National Advisory Commission on Libraries in 1966 to appraise the role and adequacy of the nation's libraries and to recommend ways of improving them.   Members of the Commision appointed: Dr. Douglas Knight, president, Duke University, as Commission chairman; Verner W. Clapp, president, Council on Library and Information Resources; Carl Overhage, director of Project INTREX, M.I.T.; Herman H. Fussler, director of libraries, University of Chicago; Theodore Waller, president, Grolier Educational Corporation; Wilbur Schramm, director, Institute for Communication Research, Stanford University; Launor Carter,  System Development Corporation; William N. Hubbard, Jr., chairman, Educause  (then EDUCOM); Caryl P. Haskins, Carnegie Institution for Science; Alvin C. Eurich, president, Aspen Institute; Stephen J. Wright, former president of Fisk University; Harry Ransom, University of Texas at Austin; Carl Elliott, former Congressman from Alabama; and Estelle Brodman National Library of Medicine.  

The National Advisory Commission was appointed to "make a comprehensive study and appraisal of the role of libraries as resources for scholarly pursuits, as centers for the dissemination of knowledge, and as components of the evolving national information systems.  The Commission report, Libraries at Large: Tradition, Innovation, and the National Interest; the Resource Book Based on the Materials of the National Advisory Commission on Libraries, provided documentation for legislation. 

Other responsibilities included the appraisal of public agency programs and library funding. The Commission also had the task of making recommendations for government and private agencies to "ensure an effective and efficient library system for the Nation." After Hearings before the United States House Committee on Education and Labor, Select Subcommittee on Education the Advisory Commission ultimately recommended "the establishment of a National Commission on Library and Information Science as a continuing Federal Planning agency."  The recommendations of the National Advisory Commission were incorporated into legislation (PL 91-345) that established the National Commission on Libraries and Information Science (NCLIS) as a permanent, independent agency of the Federal government of the United States in 1970.

Purpose
Advise the President and the Congress on the implementation of policy.
Conduct surveys and studies relative to library and information needs.
Develop plans to meet national library and information needs.
Advise federal, state, local, and private agencies regarding library and information sciences.

NCLIS Activities

Government Information
Studies making recommendations on the dissemination of federal government information, including:
1978–2001 Study of the role of government documents in a national program of library and information services.
“Principles of Public Information,” adopted by NCLIS on June 29, 1990.
“Comprehensive Assessment of Public Information Dissemination,” issued in 2001 (http://ufdc.ufl.edu/AA00038081/00040/allvolumes).

White House Conferences in 1979 and 1991
The National Commission on Libraries and Information Science sponsored two White House Conferences in 1979 and 1991.  The 1979 conference focused on 
"Elements of a Comprehensive National Library and Information Services Program"; "Legislative and Administrative Initiatives"; and a proposed National Library and Information Services Act.  Sixty-four resolutions were passed in five areas: services for personal needs, lifelong learning, organizations and the professions, social government, and international cooperation and understanding. "The resolutions asked that libraries serve people in better ways, that local control of these services be maintained, and that institutions providing the services be accountable." Attendance was 3,600. 

The 1991 Conference held July 9-13, 1991, brought more than 900 delegates representing all fifty states, the District of Columbia, and six U.S. territories. Resolutions included Access, Governance, Marketing, Networking, National Information Policy, Preservation, Services to Diverse Populations, Technology, Training of End Users, and Personnel.  Hearings were held on recommendations.

Other Activities
Between 1973 and 2000, NCLIS published at least 10 reports dealing with public libraries. These reports dealt with funding, providing Internet access to the public, and establishing community information and referral services. 
Other activities also included statistics,  the sister libraries program. and a conference on information literacy held in Prague in 2003.

Strategic Goals
In 2004 the National Commission on Libraries and Information Science (NCLIS) announced three strategic goals to guide its work in the immediate future.
Appraising and assessing library and information services provided for the American people,
Strengthening the relevance of libraries and information science in the lives of the American people,
Promoting research and development for extending and improving library and information services for the American people.

NCLIS Chairpersons
Brief biographies and photographs of NCLIS chairs are provided in Meeting the Information Needs of the American People: Past Actions and Future Initiatives Appendix B.
 Frederick Burkhardt (1970–1978)
 Charles Benton (1978–1982)
 Elinor M. Hashim (1982–1986)
 Kenneth Y. Tomlinson (1986–1987)
 Jerald C. Newman (1987–1990)
 Charles E. Reid (1990–1992) 
 J. Michael Farrell (1992–1993)
 Jeanne Hurley Simon (1993–2000)
 Martha B. Gould (2000–2003)
 Joan R. Challinor (2003–2004)
 Beth Duston Fitzsimmons (2004–2008)

NCLIS Publications
The Commission issued a comprehensive list of publications in Appendix F of its final (March 2008) report, Meeting the Information Needs of the American People: Past Actions and Future Initiatives.  The report documents the history and accomplishments of the Commission and provides a compelling future agenda for information policy research and development. Among its notable publications was Pathways to Excellence: A Report on Improving Library and Information Services for Native American Peoples

Closing
In Fiscal Year 2007–2008 appropriations, the Commission received limited funding and instructions to terminate its operations. Activities were consolidated under the Institute of Museum and Library Services, and the Commission office closed on March 30, 2008.

Footnotes

References

External links
Jeanne Hurley Simon Papers at Southern Illinois University Carbondale
Meeting the Information Needs of the American People: Past Actions and Future Initiatives (ERIC)
National Commission on Libraries and Information Science Records. (1966-1995). University of Michigan.

Library-related organizations
United States federal boards, commissions, and committees
Information science